
Isambard Kingdom Brunel (1806–1859) was an English mechanical and civil engineer.

Brunel may also refer to:

People
 Brunel (surname), a surname (and a list of people with the name)
 Brunel Fucien, Haitian footballer

Places
 Brunel Bridge (disambiguation)
 Brunel College, a predecessor to City of Bristol College
 Brunel Manor, mansion near Torquay, Devon, England
 Brunel Museum, London
 Brunel University London, England

Others
 Brunel Award, an international award for good railway design
 Brunel FM, a radio station in Swindon, England
 NR Brunel, the standard typeface for signing at Network Rail managed stations

See also
 Team Brunel, a Volvo Ocean 65 yacht
 Brunel Sunergy, a yacht
 Brunell